Liu Siyu (born 1 November 1995) is a Chinese tennis player.

Liu has a career high ATP singles ranking of 906 achieved on 11 October 2014. He also has a career high ATP doubles ranking of 1076 achieved on 9 August 2014.

Liu made his ATP main draw debut at the 2014 China Open in the doubles draw partnering Ning Yuqing.

External links

Liu Siyu at the Chinese Tennis Association

1995 births
Living people
Chinese male tennis players
Sportspeople from Dalian
Tennis players from Liaoning
21st-century Chinese people